Tokyo 7th district is a constituency of the House of Representatives in the Diet of Japan. The district is in central Tokyo City and encompasses the entire Shibuya ward, parts of Nakano,  Shinagawa and Meguro wards as well as a small part of Suginami.

Deputy leader of the Constitutional Democratic Party (CDP) and former Health Minister Akira Nagatsuma is the current representative of the district.

Background 
The district is considered a stronghold for former Health Minister Akira Nagatsuma, who grew into prominence from investigating the 2007 pensions mishandling scandal and wider misuse of public funds. Nagatsuma has been elected almost continuously since 2000, save for the 2005 Koizumi landslide where he was only returned through the proportional representation block. Nagatsuma regained the district in the 2009 landslide that brought the Democratic Party of Japan (DPJ) into power. Despite facing strong headwinds in the 2012 and 2014 LDP landslide, he managed to hold on to his seat. He was the only opposition lawmaker winning a single-seat constituency in Tokyo in the 2014 election.

Nagatsuma retained his seat in the 2017 election that was preceded by a split in the Democratic Party (DP). Nagatsuma along with liberal-leaning members of the DP like Yukio Edano and Hirotaka Akamatsu founded the CDP. He was challenged in the election by his regular LDP rival Fumiaki Matsumoto. The party housing conservative former DP members, Kibō no Tō also fielded a candidate. Akihiro Araki, the husband of Tomin First no Kai leader Chiharu Araki, was chosen to contest the seat for Kibō. Nagatsuma comfortably won his seat and increased his majority amidst a CDP surge that also resulted in gains by the party across Tokyo.

List of representatives

Election results

References 

Districts of the House of Representatives (Japan)